Ideal may refer to:

Philosophy
 Ideal (ethics), values that one actively pursues as goals
 Platonic ideal, a philosophical idea of trueness of form, associated with Plato

Mathematics
 Ideal (ring theory), special subsets of a ring considered in abstract algebra
 Ideal, special subsets of a semigroup
 Ideal (order theory), special kind of lower sets of an order
 Ideal (set theory), a collection of sets regarded as "small" or "negligible"
 Ideal (Lie algebra), a particular subset in a Lie algebra
 Ideal point, a boundary point in hyperbolic geometry
 Ideal triangle, a triangle in hyperbolic geometry whose vertices are ideal points

Science
 Ideal chain, in science, the simplest model describing a polymer
 Ideal gas law, in physics, governing the pressure of an ideal gas
 Ideal transformer, an electrical transformer having zero resistance and perfect magnetic threading
 Ideal final result, in TRIZ methodology, the best possible solution
 Thought experiment, sometimes called an ideal experiment
 Ideal type, a social science term
 Ideal solution, a solution with thermodynamic properties analogous to those of a mixture of ideal gases

Entertainment
 Ideal (group), a late-1990s/2000s American R&B group
 Ideal (German band), an early-1980s German rock group
 Ideal (album), a 1999 album by the R&B group Ideal
 An Ideal, a 2016 album by Li Ronghao
 Ideal (novel), a 1934 novel by Ayn Rand, published in 2015
 Ideal (play), a 1936 play by Ayn Rand, adapted from the novel, published in 1989
 Ideal (TV series), a British situation comedy
 Ideal Film Company, a British film studio of the Silent Era
 Ideal Ice Cream, an ice cream company
 Ideal Toy Company, a defunct toy company

Places
 Ideal, Georgia
 Ideal, Illinois
 Ideal, South Dakota
 Ideal Mini School

Miscellaneous
 Changhe Ideal, a city car produced by a joint-venture of Changhe and Suzuki
 Ideal 18, a Canadian sailboat design
 IDEAL Scholars Fund, an American scholarship program for underrepresented students
 Ideal (newspaper), a Spanish-language newspaper
 iDEAL, an online payment method in the Netherlands
 Ideal Industries, an American manufacturer of electrical connectors and tools
 IDEAL framework (Idea, Development, Exploration, Assessment, Long-term study), a framework for describing the stages of innovation in surgery
 IDEAL (Interactive Development Environment for an Application Lifecycle), a development language above COBOL for DATACOM/DB

See also

 
 
 Idealism (disambiguation)
 Idea
 Idol (disambiguation)
 Idle (disambiguation)
 Idyl (disambiguation)